Door County Cherryland Airport  is a county-owned public-use airport in Door County, Wisconsin, United States. It is located two nautical miles (4 km) west of the central business district of Sturgeon Bay, Wisconsin. It is included in the Federal Aviation Administration (FAA) National Plan of Integrated Airport Systems for 2021–2025, in which it is categorized as a local general aviation facility.

Door County Cherryland Airport is home to the Door County Civil Air Patrol Composite Squadron (WI-197). The Experimental Aircraft Association (EAA) Chapter 630, Peninsula Flyers, are also based at the airfield.

History 

The airport was officially opened in 1939. To celebrate, a performer known as Dare Devil McCann was buried and then dug up again ten days later. During his confinement, he was fed milk through a tube and attended by a nurse. Visitors could pay to view him in the casket. This was the first time a "buried alive for ten days" type stunt was performed in the state. Other attractions included an air show and a parachute jump.

Facilities and aircraft 
Door County Cherryland Airport covers an area of 436 acres (176 ha) at an elevation of 724 feet (221 m) above mean sea level. It has two asphalt paved runways: 2/20 is 4,599 by 75 feet (1,402 x 23 m) and 10/28 is 3,199 by 75 feet (975 x 23 m), all having approved GPS approaches.

For the 12-month period ending September 14, 2021, the airport had 23,150 aircraft operations, an average of 63 per day: 97% general aviation, 2% air taxi and 1% military. In January 2023, there were 25 aircraft based at this airport: 20 single-engine, 4 multi-engine and 1 jet.

Incidents 
On April 2, 2012, an 81-year-old pilot was flying with his wife when he lost consciousness and ultimately died in mid-air. His 80-year-old wife took over the controls of the plane and successfully landed it at Door County Cherryland Airport. Her husband was pronounced dead on scene.

Climate

Images

See also 
 List of airports in Wisconsin

References

External links 

 Door County Cherryland Airport
 Airport page at Door County website
  from Wisconsin DOT
 Tailwind Flight Center - Sturgeon Bay, the fixed-base operator (FBO)
 

Airports in Wisconsin
Buildings and structures in Door County, Wisconsin
Transportation in Door County, Wisconsin